is a former Japanese football player.

Playing career
Kawakatsu was born in Kyoto Prefecture on September 19, 1975. After graduating from Doshisha University, he joined his local club, Kyoto Purple Sanga in 1998. He debuted in 1998 and played many matches as a substitute forward through the early part of the 1999 season. However he did not play at all in late 1999 and retired at the end of the 2000 season.

Club statistics

References

External links

kyotosangadc

1975 births
Living people
Doshisha University alumni
Association football people from Kyoto Prefecture
Japanese footballers
J1 League players
Kyoto Sanga FC players
Association football forwards